A las 11 (11 o' clock) is a Chilean morning television program which aired on Telecanal since October 1, 2012.

References

External links 
  

2012 Chilean television series debuts
Chilean television talk shows
Telecanal original programming
Breakfast television